This is a list by date of birth of historically recognized American fine artists known for the creation of artworks that are primarily visual in nature, including traditional media such as painting, sculpture, photography, and printmaking.

Born before 1800
 John White (c. 1540–c. 1606), artist-illustrator, surveyor
 Jacob Gerritse Strycker (1615–1687), artist, possibly of the Rembrandt studios
 Thomas Smith (died c. 1691), painter
 John Smybert (1688–1751), painter
 Robert Feke (ca. 1705/1707–1750), painter
 Joseph Badger (c. 1707/8–1765), painter
 Jeremiah Theus (1716–1774), painter
 Patience Wright (1725–1786), sculptor
 John Hesselius (1728–1778), painter 
 John Singleton Copley (c. 1738–1815), painter
 Benjamin West (1738–1820), painter
 Charles Willson Peale (1741–1827), painter
 Henry Benbridge (1743–1812), painter
 James Peale (1749–1831), painter
 Ralph Earl (1751–1801), painter
 Gilbert Charles Stuart (1755–1828), painter
 William Rush (1756–1833), sculptor
 John Trumbull (1756–1843), painter
 Mather Brown (1761–1831), painter
 James Earl (1761–1796), painter
 Edward Savage (1761–1817), painter
 John Brewster Jr. (1766–1854), painter
 Ruth Henshaw Bascom (1772–1848), folk art portraitist
 William Jennys (1774–1859), primitive portrait painter
 Raphaelle Peale (1774–1825), painter
 Cephas Thompson (1775–1856), portrait painter
 Jacob Eichholtz (1776–1842), portrait painter
 John Vanderlyn (1776–1852), painter
 Rembrandt Peale (1778–1860), painter
 Washington Allston (1779–1843), painter
 Edward Hicks (1780–1849), painter
 John Wesley Jarvis (c. 1781–1839), painter
 Thomas Sully (1783–1872), painter
 Solomon Willard (1783–1861), stone carver
 Bass Otis (1784–1861), painter
 Rubens Peale (1784–1865), painter
 John James Audubon (1785–1851), painter of birds and nature
 Charles Bird King (1785–1862), portrait painter
 James Frothingham (1786–1864), painter
 John Lewis Krimmel (1786–1821), America's first genre painter
 Hannah Cohoon (1788–1864), painter
 Sarah Goodridge (1788–1853), painter of miniatures
 Matthew Harris Jouett (1788–1827), portrait artist
 William Edward West (1788–1859), portrait painter
 Hezekiah Augur (1791–1858), sculptor and inventor
 Samuel F. B. Morse (1791–1872), painter, inventor
 Alvan Fisher (1792–1863), painter
 Susanna Paine (1792–1862), portrait artist
 James Bowman (c. 1793–1842), painter
 Thomas Doughty (1793–1856), painter
 Amasa Hewins (1795–1855), painter
 George Catlin (1796–1872), painter
 Asher Durand (1796–1886), painter
 John Neagle (1796–1865), painter
 Elizabeth Goodridge (1798–1882), painter of miniatures
 Titian Peale (1799–1885), painter

Born 1800–1809
1800
 Francis Alexander (1800–1881), painter

1801
 Thomas Cole (1801–1848), painter
 Henry Inman (1801–1846), painter
 John Quidor (1801–1881), painter

1803
 Robert Walter Weir (1803–1889), painter

1804
 Fitz Hugh Lane (1804–1865), painter

1805
 Horatio Greenough (1805–1852), sculptor
 Hiram Powers (1805–1873), sculptor

1806
 Peter Rindisbacher (1806–1834), watercolorist, illustrator

1807
 William Sidney Mount (1807–1868), painter

1808
 Seth Eastman (1808–1875), painter, illustrator

1809
 Moses Billings (1809–1884), portrait painter
 James Guy Evans (1809/1810–1859), painter
 George Winter, English-born portrait painter noted for his pictures of Potawatomi and Miami figures

Born 1810–1819
1811
 George Caleb Bingham (1811–1879), painter
 John William Casilear (1811–1893), painter
 William Page (1811–1885), painter

1812
 Jane Stuart (1812–1888), portrait painter

1813
 Joseph Goodhue Chandler (1813–1884), portrait painter
 Nathaniel Currier (1813–1888), lithographer
 George Peter Alexander Healy (1813–1894), portrait painter
 Asahel Lynde Powers (1813–1843), portrait painter
 William Ranney (1813–1857), painter

1814
 Edward Bailey (1814–1903), American/Hawaiian painter

1815
 Joseph Horace Eaton (1815–1896), New Mexico landscapes

1816
 Daniel DeWitt Tompkins Davie (1816–1877), photographer
 George Whiting Flagg (1816–1898), painter
 John Frederick Kensett (1816–1872), painter
 Emanuel Gottlieb Leutze (1816–1868), painter

1817
 Benjamin Champney (1817–1907), painter
 Peter F. Rothermel (1817–1895), painter

1819
 Richard Saltonstall Greenough (1819–1904), sculptor
 Martin Johnson Heade (1819–1904), painter
 James Augustus Suydam (1819–1865), painter

Born 1820–1829

1820
 Aramenta Dianthe Vail (1820–1888), painter
 John E. Weyss (1820–1903), artist and cartographer
 Worthington Whittredge (1820–1910), painter

1821
 Robert Duncanson (c. 1821–1872), painter, muralist
 Persis Goodale Thurston Taylor (1821–1906), Hawaiian-born painter and sketch artist

1822
 Mathew Brady (1822–1896), photographer

1823
 Daniel Folger Bigelow (1823–1910), painter
 Jasper Francis Cropsey (1823–1900), painter
 Sanford Robinson Gifford (1823–1880), painter
 William Hart (1823–1894), painter
 Thomas Waterman Wood (1823–1903), painter

1824
 William Morris Hunt (1824–1879), painter
 James Merritt Ives (1824–1895), lithographer
 Eastman Johnson (1824–1906), painter

1825
 Benjamin Paul Akers (1825–1861), sculptor
 Vincent Colyer (1825–1888), painter
 Jacob Guptil Fletcher (1825–1889), painter
 George Inness (1825–1894), painter
 William Henry Rinehart (1825–1874), sculptor

1826
 Frederic Edwin Church (1826–1900), painter

1827
 David Johnson (1827–1908), painter
 Francis Blackwell Mayer (1827–1899), painter
 Candace Wheeler (1827–1923), interior and textile design

1828
 Edward Mitchell Bannister (1828–1901), painter
 James McDougal Hart (1828–1901), painter
 Jervis McEntee (1828–1891), painter

1829
 Albert Fitch Bellows (1829–1883), painter
 Thomas Hill (1829–1908)
 Edward Moran (1829–1901), painter

Born 1830–1839
1830
 Albert Bierstadt (1830–1902), painter
 Sylvester Phelps Hodgdon (1830–1906), painter
 Eadweard Muybridge (1830–1904), photographer
 Granville Perkins (1830–1895), painter, engraver
 John Quincy Adams Ward (1830–1910), sculptor

1831
 Cornelia Adele Strong Fassett (1831–1898), political portrait painter
 Hermann Ottomar Herzog (1831–1932), painter

1832
 Samuel Colman (1832–1920), painter, interior designer
 Daniel Charles Grose (1832–1900), painter
 William Savage (1832–1908), painter

1833
 Margarete Garvin Gillin (1833–1915), painter
 Hugo Wilhelm Arthur Nahl (1833–1889), painter, daguerreotyper, engraver, portraitist
 William Trost Richards (1833–1905), painter

1834
 Dwight Benton (1834–1903), painter
 Caspar Buberl (1834–1899), sculptor
 James McNeill Whistler (1834–1903), painter, printmaker

1835
 William Stanley Haseltine (1835–1900), painter
 John LaFarge (1835–1910), painter, stained-glass window designer
 Edmund Darch Lewis (1835–1910), painter
 Adah Isaacs Menken (1835–1868), actress, painter and poet

1836
 Winslow Homer (1836–1910), painter, illustrator, printmaker
 Alexander Helwig Wyant (1836–1892), painter

1837
 Robert Wilson Andrews (1837–1922)
 Alfred Thompson Bricher (1837–1908), painter
 Elizabeth Jane Gardner (1837–1922), salon painter
 Thomas Moran (1837–1926), painter

1838
 Caroline Morgan Clowes (1838–1904), painter

1839
 Robert Crannell Minor (1839–1904), painter
 Henry Bacon (1839–1912), painter
 Arthur Quartley (1839–1886), painter
 Robert Wylie (1839–1877), painter

Born 1840–1849
1840
 Abigail May Alcott Nieriker (1840–1879), artist
 Caroline Shawk Brooks (1840–1913), sculptor
 Robert Swain Gifford (1840–1905), painter
 Thomas Hovenden (1840–1895), painter
 Thomas Nast (1840–1902), caricaturist, cartoonist, illustrator
 Claude Monet (1840–1926), painter

1841
 John Joseph Enneking (1841–1916), painter
 Edward Lamson Henry (1841–1919), painter
 Theodore Otto Langerfeldt (1841–1906), painter
 John Ferguson Weir (1841–1926), painter, sculptor

1842
 Willis Seaver Adams (1842–1921), painter
 Conrad Wise Chapman (1842–1910), war painter
 Preston Powers (1842–1904), sculptor

1843
 Alexander Wilson Drake (1843–1916), painter, wood engraver
 George Albert Frost (1843–1907), painter
 William Henry Jackson (1843–1942), painter, photographer

1844
 Mary Cassatt (1844–1926), painter, printmaker
 Thomas Eakins (1844–1916), painter, photographer, sculptor
 Moses Jacob Ezekiel (1844–1917), sculptor
 Henry Farrer (1844–1903), painter, printmaker
 Carl Gutherz (1844–1907), symbolist
 Olin Levi Warner (1844–1896), sculptor

1845
 Edmonia Lewis (1845–1911), sculptor

1846
 Alexander Milne Calder (1846–1923), sculptor
 Francis Davis Millet (1846–1912), painter
 Julian Scott (1846–1901), painter and Civil War artist

1847
 Ralph Albert Blakelock (1847–1919), painter
 Frederick Arthur Bridgman (1847–1928), painter
 Frederick Dielman (1847–1935), painter
 Irene E. Parmelee (1847–1934), portrait artist
 Vinnie Ream (1847–1914), sculptor
 Albert Pinkham Ryder (1847–1917), painter
 T C Steele (1847–1926), painter

1848
 Frank Duveneck (1848–1919), painter
 William Harnett (1848–1892), painter
 Lilla Cabot Perry (1848–1933), painter
 Augustus Saint-Gaudens (1848–1907), sculptor
 Louis Comfort Tiffany (1848–1933), artist and designer
 Charles Henry Francis Turner (1848–1908), painter

1849
 George Newell Bowers (1849–1909), painter
 William Merritt Chase (1849–1916), painter
 Frank C. Penfold (1849–1921), painter
 Jacob Riis (1849–1914), photographer
 Abbott Handerson Thayer (1849–1921), painter
 Dwight William Tryon (1849–1925), painter
 Rufus Fairchild Zogbaum (1849–1925), illustrator, painter

Born 1850–1859
1850
 Daniel Chester French (1850–1931), sculptor
 Paul E. Harney (1850–1915), artist
 George Hitchcock (1850–1913), painter
 Robert Koehler (1850–1917), painter
 Alfred Lambourne (1850–1926), painter

1851
 J. Ottis Adams (1851–1927), painter
 Thomas Pollock Anshutz (1851–1912), painter
 Thomas Dewing (1851–1938), painter
 Arthur Burdett Frost (1851–1928), illustrator, graphic artist, comics writer, painter

1852
 Edwin Austin Abbey (1852–1911), illustrator, painter
 James Carroll Beckwith (1852–1917), painter
 Charles Graham (1852–1911), illustrator, painter
 Alfred Richard Gurrey, Sr. (1852–1944), landscape painter
 Gertrude Käsebier (1852–1934), photographer
 Theodore Robinson (1852–1896), painter
 J. Alden Weir (1852–1919), painter

1853
 William Turner Dannat (1853–1929), painter
 T. Alexander Harrison (1853–1930), painter
 John Francis Murphy (1853–1921), painter
 Howard Pyle (1853–1911), illustrator
 Henry Fitch Taylor (1853–1925), painter
 John Henry Twachtman (1853–1902), painter

1854
 William Henry Chandler (1854–1928), painter in pastels
 Hugo Anton Fisher (1854–1916), painter
 William Forsyth (1854–1935), painter
 Herbjørn Gausta (1854–1924), landscape artist
 L. Birge Harrison (1854–1929), painter
 George Inness, Jr. (1854–1926), painter
 Leonard Ochtman (1854–1935), painter
 John Frederick Peto (1854–1907), painter

1855
 Cecilia Beaux (1855–1942), painter
 Jacob Fjelde (1855–1896), Norwegian-born American sculptor
 Claudine Raguet Hirst (1855–1942), still life painter
 James Edward Kelly (1855–1933), sculptor, illustrator
 Charles Henry Niehaus (1855–1935), sculptor
 Julius LeBlanc Stewart (1855–1919), painter

1856
 Robert C. Barnfield (1856–1893), painter
 Colin Campbell Cooper (1856–1937), painter
 Kenyon Cox (1856–1919), painter
 Charles Harold Davis (1856–1933), painter
 John Haberle (1856–1933), painter
 Anna Elizabeth Klumpke (1856–1942), painter
 John Singer Sargent (1856–1925), portrait artist

1857
 Lucy Angeline Bacon (1857–1932), painter
 Alice Pike Barney (1857–1931), painter
 Bruce Crane (1857–1937), painter
 Edward Wilson Currier (1857–1918), painter
 Arthur Wesley Dow (1857–1922), painter, printmaker
 Charles Warren Eaton (1857–1937), painter
 Emma B. King (1857–1933), impressionist
 Florence MacKubin (1857–1918), portrait painter
 George E. Ohr (1857–1918), ceramic potter
 Edward Clark Potter (1857–1923), sculptor
 Frank Raubicheck (1857–1952), painter
 John Vanderpoel (1857–1911), painter, graphics
 Mary Rogers Williams (1857–1907), painter

1858
 Herbert Adams (1858–1945), sculptor
 Joseph DeCamp (1858–1923), painter
 Francis Edwin Elwell (1858–1922), sculptor
 Frederick Gottwald (1858–1941), painter
 Charles S. Kaelin (1858–1929, painter
 Willard Metcalf (1858–1925), painter
 Henry Siddons Mowbray (1858–1928), painter
 Edward Otho Cresap Ord, II (1858–1923), painter and poet
 Maurice Prendergast (1858–1924), painter
 Henry Ward Ranger (1858–1916), painter
 William B. T. Trego (1858–1909), painter

1859
 William Bliss Baker (1859–1886), painter
 George Elbert Burr (1859–1939), painter, printmaker
 Walter Leighton Clark (1859–1935), painter, sculptor
 Childe Hassam (1859–1935), painter, printmaker
 Joseph Henry Sharp (1859–1953), painter
 Henry Ossawa Tanner (1859–1937), painter

Born 1860–1869
1860
 William Jacob Baer (1860–1941), painter
 Carl Eytel (1862–1925), landscape painter, illustrator
 John Kane (1860–1934), painter
 Dodge MacKnight (1860–1950), painter
 Arthur Frank Mathews (1860–1945), painter
 Grandma Moses (1860–1961), painter
 Iris Nampeyo (c. 1860–1942), potter, ceramic artist
 Anna M. Sands (1860–1927/1940), painter
 Lorado Taft (1860–1936), sculptor

1861
 Dennis Miller Bunker (1861–1890), painter
 Theodore Earl Butler (1861–1936), painter
 Charles Courtney Curran (1861–1942), painter
 D. Howard Hitchcock (1861–1943), painter
 Florence Koehler (1861–1944)
 Wilton Lockwood (1861–1914), artist
 Clara Weaver Parrish (1861–1925), painter, printmaker, stained glass designer
 Frederic Remington (1861–1909), painter, sculptor, illustrator
 Frank Rinehart (1861–1928), photographer, illustrator
 Douglas Tilden (1861–1935), sculptor

1862
 Adam Emory Albright (1862–1957), painter of figures in landscapes
 Frank Weston Benson (1862–1951), painter, printmaker
 Charles Grafly (1862–1929), sculptor
 Alice De Wolf Kellogg (1862–1900), painter
 Hudson Mindell Kitchell (1862–1944), luminescent and tonalist landscapes
 Albert Pike Lucas (1862–1945), landscape, figure, and portrait
 Adolfo Müller-Ury (1862–1947), painter
 Mina Fonda Ochtman (1862–1924), painter
 Robert Reid (1862–1929), painter and muralist
 Edmund C. Tarbell (1862–1938), painter

1863
 George Gray Barnard (1863–1938), sculptor
 Arthur B. Davies (1863–1928), painter, printmaker
 Frederick William MacMonnies (1863–1937), sculptor
 Verner Moore White (1863–1923), painter
 Jessie Willcox Smith (1863–1935), Illustrator

1864
 Charles Basing (1864–1933), artist
 George Henry Bogert (1864–1944), painter
 Henry Golden Dearth (1864–1918), painter
 Louis Eilshemius (1864–1941), painter
 William Frederic Ritschel (1864–1949), German American painter
 Charles Marion Russell (1864–1926), painter, sculptor
 Alfred Stieglitz (1864–1946), photographer
 Svend Rasmussen Svendsen (1864–1945), Norwegian American impressionist artist
 Charles Herbert Woodbury (1864–1940), painter

1865
 George Bridgman (1865–1943), painter
 Herbert A. Collins (1865–1937), landscape and portrait painter
 Thomas Cromwell Corner (1865–1938), portrait painter
 Leon Dabo (1865–1960), painter
 Frank Vincent DuMond (1865–1951), painter
 Robert Henri (1865–1929), painter
 Adelaide Alsop Robineau (1865–1929), painter and potter

1866
 Karl Albert Buehr (1866–1952), painter
 E. Irving Couse (1866–1935), painter, illustrator
 Helen Thomas Dranga (1866–1940), painter
 Jenny Eakin Delony (1866–1949), painter
 Emil Fuchs (1866–1929), Austrian-born painter, emigrated to US in 1915
 Arvid Nyholm (1866–1927), Swedish-American portrait and landscape artist
 Theodore Scott-Dabo (1866–1928), painter
 Henry Otto Wix (1866–1922), German-born American painter
 Art Young (1866–1943), cartoonist

1867
 Reynolds Beal (1867–1951), painter
 Oscar Florianus Bluemner (1867–1938), painter
 Gutzon Borglum (1867–1941), sculptor
 Harry Buckwalter (1867–1930), photographer, filmmaker
 Wickliffe Covington (1867–1938), painter
 Henry Brown Fuller (1867–1934), painter
 Charles Dana Gibson (1867–1944), graphic artist
 George Luks (1867–1933), painter
 Jerome Myers (1867–1940), painter
 Bela Lyon Pratt (1867–1917), sculptor
 William Sommer (1867–1949), painter
 Allen Butler Talcott (1867–1908), painter
 Frank Lloyd Wright (1867–1959), architect, innovator

1868
 Solon Borglum (1868–1922), sculptor
 Merton Clivette (1868–1931), painter
 Edward S. Curtis (1868–1952), photographer
 Nellie Huntington Gere (1868–1949), painter and illustrator
 Alfred Henry Maurer (1868–1932), painter
 Bert Geer Phillips (1868–1956), painter
 Anne Louise Gregory Ritter (1868–1929), painter and ceramicist
 Anna Woodward (1868–1935), painter

1869
 Kate Carew (1869–1961), caricaturist
 Percy Gray (1869–1952), painter
 Mary Sheppard Greene (1869–1958), painter and illustrator
 Charles Hopkinson (1869–1962), painter
 Wilson Irvine (1869–1936), painter
 Xavier Timoteo Martinez (1869–1943), painter
 William McGregor Paxton (1869–1941), painter
 Edward Willis Redfield (1869–1965), painter
 Janet Scudder (1869–1940), sculptor
 Harriet "Hattie" Elizabeth Wilcox (1869–1943), ceramics artist

Born 1870–1879
1870
 Thomas P. Barnett (1870–1929), painter
 Anna Richards Brewster (1870–1952), painter
 Alexander Stirling Calder (1870–1945), sculptor
 William Glackens (1870–1938), painter
 John Marin (1870–1953), painter, printmaker
 John T. McCutcheon (1870–1949), political cartoonist
 Maxfield Parrish (1870–1966), painter, illustrator
 Augustus Vincent Tack (1870–1949), painter
 Frederick Weygold (1870–1941), painter and photographer
 Adolph Alexander Weinman (1870–1952), sculptor
 Samuel Washington Weis (1870–1956), painter
 Enid Yandell (1870–1934), sculptor

1871
 Edith Woodman Burroughs (1871–1916), sculptor
 Angel De Cora (1871–1919), painter, illustrator
 Margaret Fernie Eaton (1871–1953), artist, book plate illustrator
 Lyonel Feininger (1871–1956), printmaker
 Elizabeth Shippen Green (1871–1954), illustrator
 Albert Herter (1871–1950), artist and painter
 Granville Redmond (1871–1935), painter
 John French Sloan (1871–1951), painter
 Edward Charles Volkert (1871–1935), painter
 Clark Voorhees (1871–1933), painter

1872
 Charles Avery Aiken (1872–1965), painter, watercolorist
 Robert Winthrop Chanler (1872–1930), muralist
 Charles Webster Hawthorne (1872–1930), painter
 Edna Boies Hopkins (1872–1937), woodblock print artist
 Frederick Dana Marsh (1872–1961), illustrator
 George L. Viavant (1872–1925), acquascape artist
 Bessie Potter Vonnoh (1872–1955), sculptor

1873
 Jane Emmet de Glehn (1873–1961)
 Albert Henry Krehbiel (1873–1945), painter, muralist
 Ernest Lawson (1873–1939), painter
 Paul Mersereau (born 1873), painter
 Arthur Putnam (1873–1930), sculptor
 Juliet Thompson (1873–1956), painter
 Cordelia Wilson (1873–1953), painter

1874
 John Wolcott Adams (1874–1925), drawing
 Ernest L. Blumenschein (1874–1960), painter
 Franklin Booth (1874–1948), illustrator
 Romaine Brooks (1874–1970), painter
 Ira J. Deen (1874–1952), artist
 Harold Heartt Foley (1874–1923), painter, collagist, and illustrator
 Arnold Friedman (1874–1946), painter
 Frederick Carl Frieseke (1874–1939), painter
 Charles R. Knight (1874–1953), dinosaur artist
 Violet Oakley (1874–1961), muralist
 Rose O'Neill (1874–1944), first comic strip artist
 Hans K. Schuler (1874–1951), sculptor

1875
 Ethel Blanchard Collver (1875–1955), Impressionist artist and teacher
 Alice Cooper (1875–1937), sculptor
 Maynard Dixon (1875–1946), painter
 Dulah Marie Evans (1875–1951), painter, illustrator, printmaker, photographer, etcher
 Charles Keck (1875–1951), sculptor
 Marion Wachtel (1875–1951), painter
 Gertrude Vanderbilt Whitney (1875–1942), sculptor

1876
 Alson S. Clark (1876–1949), painter
 Edith Dimock (1876–1955), painter
 Eulabee Dix (1878–1961), water colour portrait miniatures
 James Earle Fraser (1876–1953), sculptor
 Cornelia Ellis Hildebrandt (1876–1962), painter of miniatures
 Anna Hyatt Huntington (1876–1973), sculptor
 Kenneth Hayes Miller (1876–1952), painter
 Frederick Pawla (1876–1964), painter and muralist
 Boardman Robinson (1876–1952), Canadian American painter
 Paul R. Schumann (1876–1946), impressionist seascapes
 Everett Shinn (1876–1953), painter and illustrator
 Walter Ufer (1876–1936), printer, illustrator
 Bessie Wheeler (born 1876), painter

1877
 Eda Nemoede Casterton (1877–1969), painter
 Rinaldo Cuneo (1877–1939), painter
 Rudolph Dirks (1877–1968), cartoonist
 Paul Dougherty (1877–1947), painter
 Katherine S. Dreier (1877–1952), painter
 James Montgomery Flagg (1877–1960), illustrator, painter
 Edmund Greacen (1877–1949), painter
 Marsden Hartley (1877–1943), painter
 William Penhallow Henderson (1877–1943), painter and architect
 Walt Kuhn (1877–1949), painter
 Mary Elizabeth Price (1877–1965)
 Joseph Stella (1877–1946), painter
 Maurice Sterne (1877/78–1957), sculptor
 Mahonri Young (1877–1957), sculptor

1878
 Robert Ingersoll Aitken (1878–1949), sculptor
 Abastenia St. Leger Eberle (1878–1942), sculptor
 Wilhelmina Weber Furlong (1878–1962), still life painter
 E. William Gollings (1878–1932), western painter
 Anna Coleman Ladd (1878–1939), sculptor
 Gus Mager (1878–1956), cartoonist, illustrator, painter
 Abraham Walkowitz (1878–1965), painter

1879
 Gifford Beal (1879–1956), painter
 Helena Smith Dayton (1879–1960), painter and sculptor
 Julian Martinez (1879–1943), potter, ceramist
 Charles Cary Rumsey (1879–1922), sculptor
 George Demont Otis (1879–1962), landscape artist
 Arthur Prince Spear (born 1879), imaginary and fantasy painter
 William Starkweather (1879–1969), impressionist painter
 Edward Steichen (1879–1973), photographer, painter
 Gunnar Widforss (1879–1934), painter specializing in National Park landscapes

Born 1880–1889
1880
 Wilford Conrow (1880–1957), portrait painting
 Arthur Dove (1880–1946), painter
 Sir Jacob Epstein (1880–1959), sculptor
 George Herriman (1880–1944), cartoonist
 Hans Hofmann (1880–1966), painter
 Jonas Lie (1880–1940), painter

1881
 Gustave Baumann (1881–1971), printmaker, painter
 Chester Beach (1881–1956), sculptor
 Patrick Henry Bruce (1881–1936), painter
 Agnes Lawrence Pelton (1881–1961), modernist painter
 Allen Tupper True (1881–1955), painter, illustrator, muralist
 Max Weber (1881–1961), painter

1882
 George Bellows (1882–1925), painter, illustrator, printmaker
 Albert Bloch (1882–1961), painter
 Arthur B. Carles (1882–1952), painter
 John Covert (1882–1960), painter
 Edward Hopper (1882–1967), painter, printmaker
 Rockwell Kent (1882–1971), painter, illustrator
 Gaston Lachaise (1882–1935), sculptor
 Harry Mathes (1882–1969), painter
 Elie Nadelman (1882–1946), sculptor
 Julian Onderdonk (1882–1922), painter
 James Sessions (born 9/20/1882), artist
 Walter Pach (1883–1958), painter
 N.C. Wyeth (1882–1945), illustrator

1883
 Johann Berthelsen (1883–1972), painter
 Edward William Carlson (1883–1932), miniature portraitist
 Henry B. Christian (1883–1953), painter
 Imogen Cunningham (1883–1976), photographer
 Jo Davidson (1883–1952), sculptor
 Charles Demuth (1883–1935), painter
 Rube Goldberg (1883–1970), cartoonist, inventor
 Donna N. Schuster (1883–1953), painter
 Charles Sheeler (1883–1965), painter
 Eugene Speicher (1883–1962), painter

1884
 Walter Emerson Baum (1884–1956), painter and art school founder
 Bessie Marsh Brewer (1884–1952), painter, printmaker
 Jose de Creeft (1884–1982), sculptor
 Guy Pène du Bois (1884–1958), painter
 Harvey Dunn (1884–1952), painter
 Samuel Halpert (1884–1930), painter
 William Victor Higgins (1884–1949), painter
 Leon Kroll (1884–1974), painter
 Robert Minor (1884–1952), political cartoonist
 Horatio Nelson Poole (1884–1949), painter and printmaker

1885
 Milton Avery (1885–1965), painter, printmaker
 Oscar Cesare (1885–1948), illustrator, cartoonist, painter
 Fred Ellis (1885–1965), political cartoonist
 E. Charlton Fortune (1885–1969), impressionist painter
 Paul Manship (1885–1966), sculptor
 Josephine Paddock (1885–1964)
 Jules Pascin (born Bulgaria 1885–1930), painter
 Sophy Regensburg (1885–1974), naïve painter
 Elizabeth Sparhawk-Jones (1885–1968), painter
 Ralph Ward Stackpole (1885–1973), sculptor
 John Storrs (1885–1956), sculptor
 E. Oscar Thalinger (1885-1965), painter
 Nina B. Ward (1885–1944), painter

1886
 Pauline Boumphrey (1886–1959), sculptor
 Paul Burlin (1886–1969), painter
 Elias Goldberg (1886–1978), painter
 John R. Grabach (1886–1981), painter
 John D. Graham (1886–1961), painter
 Aldro Hibbard (1886–1972), painter
 Frederick Kann (1886–1965), painter
 Charles James Martin (1886–1955), painter
 Morgan Russell (1886–1953), painter
 Joseph Tepper (1886–1977), portrait painter and artist
 Edward Weston (1886–1958), photographer
 Mary Agnes Yerkes (1886–1989), painter

1887
 Sam Charles (1887–1949), painter
 Andrew Dasburg (1887–1979), painter
 Manierre Dawson (1887–1969), painter
 Marcel Duchamp (1887–1968), painter, sculptor
 Louis Grell (1887–1960), painter, muralist
 Maria Martinez (1887–1980), potter, ceramist
 Georgia O'Keeffe (1887–1986), painter
 John C. Poole (1887–1926), etcher and wood engraver
 Claggett Wilson (1887–1952), painter
 Marguerite Zorach (née Thompson) (1887–1968)
 William Zorach (1887–1966), sculptor

1888
 Josef Albers (1888–1976), painter
 William Spencer Bagdatopoulos (1888–1965), painter and commercial artist
 Arnold Franz Brasz (1888–1966), painter, sculptor, and printmaker
 Augustus Dunbier (1888–1977), painter
 Gerald Murphy (1888–1967), painter
 William Robert Pearmain (1888–1912), painter
 Horace Pippin (1888–1946), painter
 Ruth Faison Shaw (1888–1969), painter

1889
 Maurice Becker (1889–1975), political cartoonist, illustrator
 Thomas Hart Benton (1889–1975), painter, muralist, printmaker
 James Daugherty (1889–1974), painter, illustrator
 Laura Gardin Fraser (1889–1966), sculptor
 Gleb Ilyin (1889–1968), portraiture and landscapes
 Geneva Mercer (1889–1984), sculptor
 Robert William Wood (1889–1979), painter

Born 1890–1899
1890
 Grace Albee (1890–1985), printmaker
 Theresa Bernstein (1890–2002), artist, painter, writer
 Gerald Curtis Delano (1890–1972), painter
 Leo Friedlander (1890–1966), sculptor
 Frances Cranmer Greenman (1890–1981), portrait painter
 Frederick Kiesler (1890–1965), sculptor, designer
 Robert Laurent (1890–1970), sculptor
 Stanton Macdonald-Wright (1890–1973), painter
 Jan Matulka (1890–1972), painter
 Man Ray (1890–1976), photographer, dadaist
 Paul Strand (1890–1976), photographer
 Mark Tobey (1890–1976), painter

1891
 Mabel Alvarez (1891–1985), painter
 George Ault (1891–1948), painter
 McClelland Barclay (1891–1942), illustrator, pin-up artist
 Francis Focer Brown (1891–1971), painter
 Arthur N. Christie (1891–1980), painter
 Edwin Dickinson (1891–1978), painter
 Robert Lee Eskridge (1891–1975), painter
 Genevieve Springston Lynch (1891–1960)
 Justin McCarthy (1891–1977), self-taught artist
 Alma Woodsey Thomas (1891–1978), painter
 Jennings Tofel (1891–1959)
 Grant Wood (1891–1942), painter

1892
 Ralph Pallen Coleman (1892–1968), painter and illustrator
 Hugo Gellert (1892–1985), illustrator and muralist
 Naomi Polk (1892–1984), American artist, watercolors and poet
 Augusta Savage (1892–1962), sculptor, teacher
 Vaclav Vytlacil (1892–1984), painter, teacher
 John Ellsworth Weis (1892–1962), painter
 Winslow Wilson (1892–1974), painter, teacher

1893
 Charles E. Burchfield (1893–1967), painter
 Rene Paul Chambellan (1893–1955), sculptor
 Pál Fried (1893–1976), oil painter, dancers,  nudes, and portraits
 Wanda Gág (1893–1946), printmaker, illustrator
 George Albert Gale (1893–1951), nautical themed artist
 R. H. Ives Gammell (1893–1981), painter
 Yasuo Kuniyoshi (1893–1953), painter
 Bernard E. Peters (1893-1949), painter
 Abraham Rattner (1893–1978), painter

1894
 Marjorie Acker (1894–1985), painter
 Stuart Davis (1894–1964), painter
 Ernest Fiene (1894–1965), lithographer, printmaker
 Otto Kuhler (1894–1977), painter
 Lucile Lloyd (1894–1941), muralist
 Bashka Paeff (1894–1979), sculptor
 Norman Rockwell (1894–1978), painter, illustrator
 Amanda Snyder (1894–1980), painter, printmaker
 James Thurber (1894–1961), cartoonist

1895
 Talbert Abrams (1895–1990), photographer
 Frederick Cornelius Alston (1895–1987), painter
 Peggy Bacon (1895–1987), printmaker, painter, illustrator
 Lucile Blanch (1895–1981), painter
 Adolf Dehn (1895–1968), lithographer, illustrator
 Buckminster Fuller (1895–1983), architect, visionary
 Harry Gottlieb (1895–1993), painter, illustrator
 Regina Olson Hughes (1895–1993), botanical illustrator
 Millie Rose Lalk (1895–1943), painter
 Dorothea Lange (1895–1965), photographer
 John Allen Wyeth (1895–1981), painter

1896
 Arnold Blanch (1896–1968), painter, printmaker
 Allyn Cox (1896–1982), painter, muralist
 John Russell Fulton (1896–1979), painter, illustrator
 Morris Kantor (1896–1974), painter
 Barbara Latham (1896–1989), painter, printmaker, illustrator
 Eve Ryder (1896-1984), painter
 Charmion von Wiegand (1896–1983), painter

1897
 James Billmyer (1897–1989), painter, illustrator
 Charles Ragland Bunnell (1897–1968), painter
 John Steuart Curry (1897–1946), painter, muralist, printmaker
 William Gropper (1897–1977), cartoonist, painter, muralist, printmaker
 Theodore Lukits (1897–1992), painter, muralist, illustrator, teacher
 Caroline Mytinger (1897–1980), painter
 Reuben Nakian (1897–1986), sculptor
 Dudley Pratt (1897–1975), sculptor
 Matthew E. Ziegler (1897-1981), painter, muralist

1898
 Berenice Abbott (1898–1991), photographer
 Samuel Adler (1898–1979), artist
 Dewey Albinson (1898–1971), artist
 Robert Brackman (1898–1980), painter
 Alexander Calder (1898–1976), sculptor
 Aaron Douglas (1899–1979), painter
 Elsie Driggs (1898–1992), painter
 Lorser Feitelson (1898–1978), painter
 Hyman William Katz (1898–1988), painter, printmaker
 Reginald Marsh (1898–1954), painter, printmaker
 John McLaughlin (1898–1976), painter
 Kay Sage (1898–1963), painter
 Ben Shahn (1898–1969), painter, printmaker, graphic artist

1899
 Eugène Berman (1899–1972), painter
 Francis Chapin (1899–1965), painter
 Gladys Emerson Cook (1899-1976), painter, illustrator
 De Hirsh Margules (1899–1965), painter
 Louise Nevelson (1899–1988), assemblage artist, sculptor
 Moses Soyer (1899–1974), painter
 Raphael Soyer (1899–1987), painter
 Bradley Walker Tomlin (1899–1955), painter

See also 

 American art
 Native American artists
 African American art
 Sculpture of the United States
 Feminist art movement
 Hudson River School
 Luminism
 American Impressionism
 Ashcan School
 Precisionism
 American scene painting
 Regionalism
 WPA Federal Art Project
 Northwest School
 Abstract expressionism
 Pop art
 Happenings
 Fluxus
 Intermedia
 Hard-edge painting
 Minimalism
 Post-painterly abstraction
 Color field painting
 Post-minimalism
 Process art
 Site-specific art
 Earth art
 Lyrical abstraction
 Photorealism
 Conceptual art
 Postmodernism

1900 and before
American artists
American artists before 1900